Olivier Morel is a French and American scholar, writer and filmmaker. He is the director of several feature-length nonfiction films (documentaries) and is the author of essays including one graphic novel with the artist and writer Maël. His academic work as well as his films highlight the importance of creation and the arts (music, literature, cinema, photography...) in the perception of historical events. He teaches at the department of Film, Television and Theatre at the University of Notre Dame in the United States.

Filmography 

 On the Bridge (L'Âme en sang, Amerikas Verletzte Seelen), 97 minutes, Zadig Productions, ARTE Grand Format, 2011.
 Germany as Told by Christoph Hein, Vladimir Kaminer, Emine Sevgi Özdamar and Bernhard Schlink, 55 minutes, Seconde Vague Productions [archive], ARTE, 2013.
 Ever, Rêve, Hélène Cixous, 118 minutes, Zadig Productions, 2018.

Webdocumentary 
  Profils 14-18 [archive], TV5 Monde, in collaboration with Didier Pazery and Claude Vittiglio.

Books 

  Visages de la Grande Guerre, Calmann-Lévy, Paris, 1998.
  Berlin Légendes ou la Mémoire des Décombres, Presses Universitaires de Vincennes, Paris, 2014.
  Revenants, drawings by Maël, Foreword by Marc Crépon, Futuropolis, Paris, 2013 
 Die Rückkehrer (German trans.), Carlsen Verlag 2014  
 Walking Wounded (English trans.), NBM Publishing, New York, 2015

Exhibits 

 Between Listening and Telling, Paris (France) City Hall, January 25-March 12, 2005, filmed testimonies of Holocaust survivors installation directed by Esther Shalev-Gerz, MK2-History (produced by Martine Saada), Mémorial de la Shoah (Paris), Paris City. The exhibit also took place in the Jeu de Paume, Paris, France, 2010 ; at the MCBA, Lausanne, Switzerland, 2012 ; at the Belkin Art Gallery, UBC, Vancouver, Canada, 2013 ; at La Galerie de l’UQAM, Montréal, Canada, 2014 ; at Wasserman Projects, Detroit, USA, 2016
 Visages de la Grande Guerre (Faces of the Great War),  Douaumont Ossuary (Verdun, France), permanent exhibit inaugurated on November 11, 2008 (with Didier Pazery, photographer).
 Vestiges et Visages de la Grande Guerre (Faces and Remains of the Great War), Great East Train Station, Paris, France, June 23-November 30, 2014 (with Didier Pazery, photographer).
 Profils 14-18 (Profiles 14-18), Museum of the Great War (Musée de la Grande Guerre), Meaux, France, June 2-December 2, 2018 (with Didier Pazery, photographer).

References 

American documentary filmmakers
French documentary filmmakers
French emigrants to the United States
Living people
People with acquired American citizenship
University of Notre Dame faculty
Year of birth missing (living people)